The 46th Academy of Country Music Awards were held on April 3, 2011, at the MGM Grand Garden Arena and Mandalay Bay in Las Vegas, Nevada. The ceremony was hosted by Reba McEntire and Blake Shelton.

Winners and nominees 
Winners are shown in bold.

Performers

Presenters

References 

Academy of Country Music Awards
Academy of Country Music Awards
Academy of Country Music Awards
Academy of Country Music Awards
Academy of Country Music Awards
Academy of Country Music Awards
Television shows directed by Glenn Weiss